{{safesubst:#invoke:RfD|||month = March
|day = 19
|year = 2023
|time = 19:19
|timestamp = 20230319191904

|content=
REDIRECT Rosalind Franklin (rover)

}}